Albert Herman Woods (born Aladore Herman; January 3, 1870 – April 24, 1951) was a Hungarian-born theatrical producer who spent much of his life in the USA. He produced over 140 plays on Broadway, including some of the most successful shows of the period, sometimes under the name of the production company 'Al Woods Ltd.'. Woods built the Eltinge Theatre on Broadway, named for one of his most successful and profitable stars, the female impersonator Julian Eltinge.

Early life
Woods was born in Budapest, Hungary to a Jewish family, but his family brought him to the United States as an infant. He grew up on the Lower East Side of Manhattan. As a child he would skip school to go to theatrical shows, where he developed the goal of becoming a producer himself.

Career
Woods formed an early partnership with Sam H. Harris and Paddy Sullivan, running tour companies of popular melodramas, starting with The Bowery After Dark. His first Broadway production was The Evil That Men Do in 1903. His work on Broadway escalated after the popularity of the touring melodramas declined. Woods had a stable of favorite playwrights, most notably Owen Davis, who he worked with for several years on melodramas such as Nellie, the Beautiful Cloak Model.  When Woods turned to producing regular Broadway shows, he focused on bedroom farces, starting with The Girl from Rector's in 1909.

During a trip to Europe in 1911 he bought the US rights to the world's first full-color feature film, The Miracle.  which eventually premiered in New York 1913. Also in 1911 he starting building the Eltinge Theatre on 42nd Street, named after his star, Julian Eltinge. By May 1911 a run of The Fascinating Widow starring Eltinge at the Boston Theatre was expected to have receipts of $500,000 by the time it finished.

From c1912 he took over the leases of a large number of Berlin theatres including what became the Ufa-Palast am Zoo, to put on 'Kino-Vaudeville' shows (a mix of variety acts imported from the US interspersed with silent films). He was also involved with the American millionaire Joe Goldsoll in the building of the German capital's first free-standing purpose-built cinema, the Ufa-Pavillon am Nollendorfplatz."

When he became successful, Woods continued to emphasize his humble roots and was known for his folksy manner with everyone. He greeted patrons at the Eltinge as "sweetheart". Upon being introduced to King George V, Woods addressed the monarch (who was older than him) as "kid" and took the opportunity to promote one of his productions, declaring it to be "a regular show".

Woods was at his peak in the 1920s, producing such hits as Ladies' Night (1920), The Demi-Virgin (1921), The Green Hat (1925), The Shanghai Gesture (1926) (filmed in 1941), and The Trial of Mary Dugan (1927). However, he lost most of his fortune in the early 1930s and never fully recovered. In the 1930s his only major hits were Five Star Final (1930) and Night of January 16th (1935). When Woods staged the Sheldon Davis comedy Try and Get It in August 1943, critics expressed hope that it would revive his flagging career, but it closed in less than a week. It was his final production.

Later life
Although Woods continued to read scripts and attempt to generate interest, he was unable to stage any productions after 1943. He died on April 24, 1951, in his residence at the Hotel Beacon in New York. The once wealthy former producer ended his life bankrupt. After a memorial service attended by many prominent theater personalities, his remains were cremated.

Censorship battles
Woods produced a number of bedroom farces, which critics and local authorities often saw as pushing the boundaries of propriety. In several instances Woods encountered legal troubles as a result.

The Girl from Rector's
In 1909, Woods staged The Girl from Rector's, Paul M. Potter's adaptation of Loute, a French farce by Pierre Veber. The plot portrays several couples in a tangle of adulterous affairs, and the play was considered indecent by many critics. Prior to opening on Broadway, preview performances were scheduled in Trenton, New Jersey. After the first matinee, a group of 25 local clergy complained to Trenton police the play was immoral. The police shut the play down and did not permit any further performances.

The Girl with the Whooping Cough

In April 1910, Woods began a production of The Girl with the Whooping Cough, an adaptation of a French farce that features a woman who spreads whooping cough by kissing numerous men. At the urging New York Mayor William Jay Gaynor, the New York City Police Commissioner attempted to suppress the play due to its risqué content. The commissioner contacted the theater's management company and threatened that if the play was not stopped, he would refuse to renew the theater's operating license. Woods got an injunction from the New York Supreme Court that prevented the authorities from interfering with the show directly, but it did not compel them to renew the license for the theater. Left with no home for his production, Woods was forced to shut it down.

The Demi-Virgin
In 1921, Woods again encountered problems with New York City censors when he produced The Demi-Virgin, a sex comedy written by Avery Hopwood that featured risque dialog and a strip poker scene. On November 3, 1921, Woods and Hopwood were called to the chambers of William McAdoo, the Chief Magistrate of the New York City's magistrates' court, to respond to complaints about the play. Woods would not make any changes to address the complaints, so McAdoo held a formal hearing and ruled that the play was obscene, describing it as "coarsely indecent, flagrantly and suggestively immoral, impure in word and action." Woods was placed on bail, and the case was sent to the grand jury for an indictment on a misdemeanor charge of staging an obscene exhibition. The grand jury heard the case on December 23, 1921, but dismissed it that same day, even though it had heard only witnesses favoring the prosecution. As the obscenity case proceeded, the city's Commissioner of Licenses threatened to revoke the theater's operating license if the production continued, but a New York state appeals court ruled that he did not have the legal authority to revoke a theater license once it had been granted.

Although Woods won the legal proceedings and the play was a hit, it was considered immoral by many critics. Woods was personally condemned by prominent rabbi Stephen S. Wise, who said the involvement of a Jewish producer with "theatrical filth" hurt the reputation of Jews generally.

Broadway productions
Woods produced over 140 plays on Broadway.

References

External links
 
 
 

1870 births
1951 deaths
American theatre managers and producers
Hungarian emigrants to the United States